The Brazil national American football team represents Brazil in international American football. It is run by the Brazilian Confederation of American Football (CBFA).

History

2000s
The team was first convened in 2007 due to an opportunity to play a friendly game with Uruguay.

The Brazil team was first formed with players drafted from regional (state or city) tournaments that had various shapes and sizes. These tournaments included beach American football, flag football and touch football. The tryouts included interstate matches, physical tests and the availability of the athletes to participate since none of them were professionals.

The first game resulted in a bitter defeat against Uruguay, in Montevideo, by a score of 20–14.

However, many positive lessons were learned that day. Despite several initial difficulties, the team had representatives from states of Mato Grosso, Rio de Janeiro, Santa Catarina and São Paulo. The general organization of the sport was already well established, more teams and tournaments were on the process of being created and the popularity of the sport was growing (mostly due to the broadcast of NFL games by ESPN).

In the year of 2008, the national team had a much stronger squad. Using the same methodology as the previous year, the team was able to field new reinforcements. Athletes from 3 other states (Paraná, Distrito Federal and Minas Gerais) were drafted to play its second game, this time at home. Unfortunately, by request of the other side, again the Uruguay national team, the game had to be cancelled, causing great disappointment to the athletes and everyone involved in the organizing of the event.

In the year of 2009, a national tournament first occurred. The best teams from each member state were chosen by the states to represent them in the tournament. The coaches of the Brazil National team now had an easier job in comparing their athletic abilities. In 2013, the Torneio Touchdown had 20 teams, some of them having naming partnership with famous association football clubs.

There is also a parallel federation with a separate national tournament. However, the Brazilian team may draft players from this tournament as well, despite having a lower quality level in general.

The Brazil team, along with Uruguay and Argentina, recently became members of the international entity IFAF.

2010s
Brazil defeated Uruguay 49–0 on 26 April 2014. Heron Azevedo was named MVP of the game.

The Women's National Team contested the World category in the months of June and July 2010 in Sweden.

Overall record
Below is table of the representative American football matches played by a Brazil national team at test level up until 16 December 2017.

Tournament records

IFAF World Championship

Roster
Roster accurate as of April 29, 2015.

References

External links

Men's national American football teams
American Football
American football in Brazil
American football teams in Brazil
2007 establishments in Brazil
American football teams established in 2007